16 Lovers Lane is the sixth album by Australian indie rock group The Go-Betweens, released in 1988 by Beggars Banquet Records.  Prior to the recording of the album, longtime bassist Robert Vickers left the band when the other group members decided to return to Australia after having spent several years in London, England; he was replaced by John Willsteed. The album was recorded at Studios 301 in Sydney, between Christmas 1987 and Autumn 1988.

16 Lovers Lane was the final release from the original version of the band.  The Go-Betweens broke up in 1989 and would produce no other material until Grant McLennan and Robert Forster reformed the band, with a completely different line-up of personnel, in 2000.

Details
In late 1987, the band relocated from the UK to Sydney. The relationship between guitarist Robert Forster and drummer Lindy Morrison had ended, whilst singer Grant McLennan and violinist Amanda Brown became more involved. Upon their return to Australia, the band added John Willsteed on bass and began preparing their sixth album.
  
The recording process for 16 Lovers Lane was different to previous releases. Between December 1987 and January 1988, McLennan and Forster began an intense songwriting process. They demoed all the songs in advance and then presented them to the producer and their bandmates, leaving less room for improvisation. McLennan stated: "We really sat down for the first time in years and wrote together in the sense that anything new we'd come up with the night before we'd go through and rearrange and discard or put it into something else. Our normal method was to write separately and the spend two weeks together, familiarising ourselves with each others songs and suggesting things. So this way was a completely different process and it was due to trying to get back to what started the band – closeness."

McLennan said the band was also affected by moving back to Australia. "We'd spent five years in London—blackness, darkness, greyness and poverty—and suddenly for some reason we seemed to have more money in Sydney, and we all had places to live and being in a city where after five years we can go to the beach in ten minutes." Forster agreed saying it brought on "a burst of energy, a burst of songs".

McLennan said, "I had a vision for this record. It was, in some way, just sitting down with acoustic guitars in sunlight, writing songs, and then making a record. It was as simple as that. And I get that vibe from the record, a summer feeling". Forster described the album as, "the perfect combination between London melancholy and Sydney sunshine".

The songwriting duo demoed sixteen tunes acoustically and sent them to English producer Mark Wallis prior to his arrival in Australia. The book 100 Best Australian Albums states that Wallis' production maintained the acoustic feel, embellishing them sparingly and "affording them a sparkle and crispness that suggested the summer that was their inspiration". Morrison was said to have "hated" Wallis, which may be a reflection of the fact that Wallis replaced Morrison with a drum machine on five of the songs on the album. Both Morrison and Brown were unhappy with the pre-production process, which limited their contribution, but Forster defended it, saying: "The pre-production to every album can't always been the same. You can't keep doing the same things over and over". Still, in the documentary Great Australian Albums (2008) episode one, on the album, Wallis says that the drumming on all of the tracks are a mix of programmed and real drums, and Morrison – not available all the time for family reasons – says that you can tell that the machine beats are still hers from the fact that "everything is so "simple".

Elsewhere, Forster blamed others for the synthetic nature of the recordings. He said: "I wanted to make the kind of record I ended up making on Danger in the Past. I just wanted the band to be playing live, get us into a really big studio. Instead, it was one person in the studio with the rest of them playing pool. Lindy would be talking about drum machines, and her and Amanda were talking about triggering the violin to make synthesizer keyboard sounds. The only two live tracks on that album are both my songs, and I insisted on those." In 2016, Forster wrote, "I had trouble with 16 Lovers Lane for a long time. It wasn't until the late nineties that I recognised it for what it was – a pop record".

The original release of the album contained ten songs. Most of McLennan's lyrics were written about Brown.

In 2004, LO-MAX Records issued a greatly expanded CD, which included a second disc of ten bonus tracks, and music videos for the songs "Streets of Your Town" (two versions) and "Was There Anything I Could Do?", which were filmed to promote 16 Lovers Lane at the time of its initial release.

Reception

In a contemporary review for The Village Voice, Robert Christgau described 16 Lovers Lane as the Go-Betweens' "straightest and catchiest bunch of love songs" and called the band "still the romantic poets good popsters ought to be." Record Mirror critic Johnny Dee lauded the album as "classic, tearful, moving." In Spin, Evelyn McDonnell wrote that the band reminded her of "whooping cranes: great gangling creatures capable of heights of gracefulness when in flight and passionate spasms when in heat. Similarly, the Go-Betweens infuse portentious poetry into giddy pop structures, then throw the uncertain songs in the air, whispering 'Fly or fuck.'" On the album's more ornate production, McDonnell felt that Wallis' "tendency to over-embellish" resulted in occasional "putrid moments", while Michael Azerrad of Rolling Stone observed "a strangely pleasant flirtation with banality in the album's honeyed melodies, soft strings and wistful, understated vocals", despite the songs conveying "a depth of emotion and a height of intellect rarely found in pop".

In 2010, 16 Lovers Lane was listed at No. 12 in the book 100 Best Australian Albums. The authors called the album "the band's high-water mark", commenting that "Forster and McLennan knew they'd nailed it" and that the songs were "their most direct, accessible and heartfelt ever", with "Forster, particularly, having learnt a new restraint. Gone was the bravado and archness that had informed much of his earlier work and in its place was an openness and honesty."

16 Lovers Lane was included in the book 1001 Albums You Must Hear Before You Die. In 2021, it was listed at No. 15 in Rolling Stone Australias "200 Greatest Australian Albums of All Time" countdown.

Track listing

Release history

Personnel

The Go-Betweens
 Amanda Brown – violin, oboe, guitar, vocals, tambourine (listed as Oliver Tambo on the sleevenotes, an in-joke of the band)
 Robert Forster – vocals, rhythm guitar, harmonica
 Grant McLennan – vocals, lead guitar
 Lindy Morrison – drums
 John Willsteed – bass guitar, guitar, Hammond organ, piano

Additional musicians
 Michael Armiger – bass on "Running the Risk of Losing You"

References

The Go-Betweens albums
1988 albums
Beggars Banquet Records albums
LO-MAX Records albums